Kristinn Freyr Sigurðsson (born 25 December 1991) is an Icelandic football attacking midfielder, who plays for Valur.

Club career

Kristinn started his career with local club Fjölnir before signing with Valur at 21 years old. In the 2016 season, he was named Players' Player of the Year in the Icelandic league, Úrvalsdeild.

In 2017, he signed with GIF Sundsvall in the Swedish Allsvenskan. He played 27 league games, scoring once, before leaving by mutual consent at the end of the season.

References

External links
 
 
 

1991 births
Living people
Kristinn Freyr Sigurdsson
Kristinn Freyr Sigurdsson
Kristinn Freyr Sigurdsson
Kristinn Freyr Sigurdsson
Association football midfielders
Kristinn Freyr Sigurdsson
Kristinn Freyr Sigurdsson
Expatriate footballers in Sweden
Kristinn Freyr Sigurdsson
Allsvenskan players
GIF Sundsvall players
Kristinn Freyr Sigurdsson
Kristinn Freyr Sigurdsson